The R406 is a Regional Route in South Africa that connects Greyton and Genadendal with the N2.

External links
 Routes Travel Info

References

Regional Routes in the Western Cape